George Mercer Dawson Secondary, now called Gudangaay Tlaats'gaa Naay Secondary School is a public high school in Masset, British Columbia.  It is one of three secondary schools and one of six schools in School District 50 Haida Gwaii/Queen Charlotte.   George Mercer Dawson Secondary officially opened on October 19, 1970, and was named after George Mercer Dawson CMG FRS FRSC, (August 1, 1849 – March 2, 1901) a Canadian scientist, surveyor and eminent authority on ethnology and archeology who undertook the Canadian Governments Geological Survey of Haida Gwaii, formerly named Queen Charlotte Islands.

Having grown up in Old Massett (aka Haida) some internationally renowned Haida Artists such as Robert Davidson, Reginald Davidson and Jim Hart attended Masset High School prior to its renaming in 1970.

References

External links
BC Ministry of Education school information.

High schools in British Columbia
Educational institutions in Canada with year of establishment missing
1970 establishments in British Columbia